Sarabas (also Romanized as Sarābas; also known as Sarāb Bas and Sarāb Bas-e Seyyed ‘Alī) is a village in Bazan Rural District, in the Central District of Javanrud County, Kermanshah Province, Iran. At the 2006 census, its population was 545, in 117 families.

References 

Populated places in Javanrud County